The Men's 800 metres at the 2010 Commonwealth Games as part of the athletics programme was held at the Jawaharlal Nehru Stadium on Friday 8 October and Sunday 10 October 2010.

The top three runners in each of the initial four heats automatically alongside the four fasters runners qualified for the semifinals. The top three plus the two fastest runners advanced to the final.

Records

Round 1
First 3 in each heat (Q) and 4 best performers (q) advance to the Semifinals.

Heat 1

Heat 2

Heat 3

Heat 4

Semifinals
First 3 in each heat (Q) and 2 best performers (q) advance to the Final.

Semifinal 1

Semifinal 2

Final

External links
2010 Commonwealth Games - Athletics

Men's 800 metres
2010